The withers is the ridge between the shoulder blades of an animal, typically a quadruped. In many species, it is the tallest point of the body. In horses and dogs, it is the standard place to measure the animal's height. In contrast, cattle are often measured to the top of the hips.

The term (pronounced ) derives from Old English wither (“against”), because it is the part of a draft animal that pushes against a load.

Horses
The withers in horses are formed by the dorsal spinal processes of roughly the 3rd through 11th thoracic vertebrae, which are unusually long in this area. Most horses have 18 thoracic vertebrae.

Since they do not move relative to the ground as the horse's head does, the withers are used as the measuring point for the height of a horse. Horse heights are extremely variable, from small pony breeds to large draft breeds.

Conformational issues
The withers of the horse are considered in evaluating conformation. Generally, a horse should have well-defined withers, as they are considered an important attachment point for the muscles of the torso. Withers of medium height are preferred, as high withers make it difficult to fit a saddle and are often associated with a narrow chest, and low withers (known as "mutton withers") do not provide a ridge to help keep the saddle in place.

More importantly, the dorsal spinal processes provide an attachment for the muscles that support the shoulder and neck. Horses do not have a clavicle, so the shoulder can freely rotate backwards. If the vertebrae of the withers are long front-to-back, the shoulder is freer to move backwards. This allows for an increase of stride length. thus increasing the horse's speed. It is also important in jumping, as the shoulder must rotate back for the horse to bring its foreleg parallel to the ground, which will then raise the animal's knees upward and get the lower part of the forelegs out of the way. Therefore, the withers have a direct impact on one of the most important points of conformation: the shoulder.

Dogs
In dogs, the height of the withers is often used to determine the dog's jump height in various dog sports. It is also often a determining factor in whether the dog conforms to the show-quality standards for its breed.

References

Animal anatomy
Dog anatomy
Horse anatomy